Tommy Marshall Maxwell (born May 5, 1947) is a former American football player. After playing college football at Texas A&M, he spent six seasons playing in the National Football League (NFL). In his second season, he helped the Baltimore Colts win Super Bowl V.

He is the founder of Coaches Outreach, a non-profit Christian organization that aims to spiritually develop high school coaches and their spouses.

College years
Maxwell lettered in football at Texas A&M from 1966–68. In the 1967 season, he helped the Aggie team win a Southwest Conference (SWC) title after a 0–4 start. The Aggies were invited to play the Cotton Bowl Classic, in which they defeated Alabama Crimson Tide. Maxwell caught a TD pass and made an interception in that game. Coach Gene Stallings is quoted as saying, "Tommy will  hurt you on either side of the ball." He was also named a first-team All-SWC wide receiver in the same season and a first-team All-American defensive back in 1968. Maxwell was inducted in to the A&M Hall of Fame in 1991. In the  1969 NFL Draft, he was picked by the Baltimore Colts in the second round (51st overall). He helped the Colts win Super Bowl V against the Dallas Cowboys as a cornerback. He is the Founder of COACHES OUTREACH, a national Christian ministry to coaches and their wives. Maxwell played 6 years in the NFL for the Oakland Raiders (John Madden) and Houston Oilers (Bum Phillips). A neck injury ended his career.

NFL career
Maxwell was drafted in the second round by the Baltimore Colts. He helped the Colts beat the Dallas Cowboys in Super Bowl V as a cornerback. Tommy also played for the Oakland Raiders (John Madden-'71-73) and Houston Oilers (Bum Phillips- '74). A career-ending neck injury forced Maxwell to retire after the 1974 season.

Notes

References

1947 births
Living people
Players of American football from Houston
American football safeties
American football wide receivers
Texas A&M Aggies football players
Baltimore Colts players
Oakland Raiders players
Houston Oilers players